The 15th parallel north is a 
circle of latitude that is 15 degrees north of the Earth's equatorial plane. It crosses the Saharan fringe (the Sahel) in Africa, three key peninsulas of Asia (between which parts of the Indian Ocean), the Pacific Ocean, an isthmus of Central America, the southern Caribbean and the Atlantic Ocean.

In the Chadian-Libyan conflict of 1978 to 1987, its intra-Chad part came to be known as the "Red Line", separating opposing combatants, above all in Operation Manta.

At this latitude the sun is visible for 13 hours, 1 minute during the summer solstice and 11 hours, 14 minutes during the winter solstice.

Around the world
Starting at the Prime Meridian and heading eastwards, the parallel 15° north passes through:

{| class="wikitable plainrowheaders" 
! scope="col" width="125" | Co-ordinates
! scope="col" | Country, territory or sea
! scope="col" | Notes
|-
| 
! scope="row" | 
|
|-
| 
! scope="row" | 
|
|-
| 
! scope="row" | 
|
|-
| 
! scope="row" | 
|
|-
| 
! scope="row" | 
| 
|-
| style="background:#b0e0e6;" | 
! scope="row" style="background:#b0e0e6;" | Red Sea
| style="background:#b0e0e6;" |
|-
| 
! scope="row" | 
|
|-
| style="background:#b0e0e6;" | 
! scope="row" style="background:#b0e0e6;" | Indian Ocean
| style="background:#b0e0e6;" | Arabian Sea
|-valign="top"
| 
! scope="row" | 
| Goa Karnataka Andhra Pradesh
|-valign="top"
| style="background:#b0e0e6;" | 
! scope="row" style="background:#b0e0e6;" | Indian Ocean
| style="background:#b0e0e6;" | Bay of Bengal Passing just north of the island of Preparis,  Andaman Sea
|-
| 
! scope="row" |  (Burma)
|
|-
| 
! scope="row" | 
| Passing through Nakhon Ratchasima
|-
| 
! scope="row" | 
|
|-
| 
! scope="row" | 
|
|-
| style="background:#b0e0e6;" | 
! scope="row" style="background:#b0e0e6;" | South China Sea
| style="background:#b0e0e6;" | Passing just south of the disputed Scarborough Shoal
|-
| 
! scope="row" | 
| Island of Luzon
|-
| style="background:#b0e0e6;" | 
! scope="row" style="background:#b0e0e6;" | Pacific Ocean
| style="background:#b0e0e6;" | Polillo Strait
|-
| 
! scope="row" | 
| Island of Polillo
|-
| style="background:#b0e0e6;" | 
! scope="row" style="background:#b0e0e6;" | Pacific Ocean
| style="background:#b0e0e6;" | Philippine Sea
|-valign="top"
| 
! scope="row" | 
| Island of Tinian
|-
| style="background:#b0e0e6;" | 
! scope="row" style="background:#b0e0e6;" | Pacific Ocean
| style="background:#b0e0e6;" | Passing north of Bokak Atoll, 
|-
| 
! scope="row" | 
| Chiapas
|-
| 
! scope="row" | 
|
|-
| 
! scope="row" | 
|
|-
| 
! scope="row" | 
| For about 11 km
|-
| 
! scope="row" | 
|
|-
| style="background:#b0e0e6;" | 
! scope="row" style="background:#b0e0e6;" | Caribbean Sea
|-
| style="background:#b0e0e6;" | 
! scope="row" style="background:#b0e0e6;" | Atlantic Ocean
| style="background:#b0e0e6;" |
|-
| 
! scope="row" | 
| Island of Fogo
|-
| style="background:#b0e0e6;" | 
! scope="row" style="background:#b0e0e6;" | Atlantic Ocean
| style="background:#b0e0e6;" |
|-
| 
! scope="row" | 
| Island of Santiago
|-
| style="background:#b0e0e6;" | 
! scope="row" style="background:#b0e0e6;" | Atlantic Ocean
| style="background:#b0e0e6;" |
|-
| 
! scope="row" | 
|
|-
| 
! scope="row" | 
|
|-valign="top"
| 
! scope="row" | 
|
|-
| 
! scope="row" | 
|
|-
| 
! scope="row" | 
|
|}

See also
14th parallel north
16th parallel north

References

n15